Hassan Mosque may refer to:
Mosque-Madrassa of Sultan Hassan in Cairo
Hassan II Mosque in Casablanca
 The incomplete mosque in Rabat incorporating the Hassan Tower